Belfast Lanyon Place (formerly Belfast Central) is a railway station serving the city of Belfast in Northern Ireland. Located on Bridge Street in the Laganside area of central Belfast, it is one of four stations in the city centre, the others being Great Victoria Street, City Hospital and Botanic. Lanyon Place is the northern terminus of the cross-border Enterprise service to Dublin Connolly. It is also served by Northern Ireland Railways, which operates routes to other locations in Northern Ireland, including Derry, Bangor, Portadown and Larne.

Description
There are two island platforms at Lanyon Place, each serving two tracks, capable of accommodating trains up to nine coaches long on each side. Platform 1 is usually only used at peak hours, as well as for special services run by the Railway Preservation Society of Ireland. Platform 2 is the Enterprise platform. Platform 3 is the 'southbound platform', normally used for trains to Great Victoria Street, Portadown, Lisburn and Newry, with Platform 4 being the 'northbound platform' for trains along the Derry, Larne and Bangor lines.

Regular services also operate between Lanyon Place and the city's other main station, Great Victoria Street which is located nearer Belfast's city centre.

2.6 million people used the station in 2017.

History
The station was opened as "Belfast Central" on Monday 26 April 1976, despite it being located further from Belfast city centre than Great Victoria Street station. The first station manager was Mr John Johnston.

By the 1990s, it became clear that the station's facilities were in need of upgrading.  A major refurbishment programme started in 2000 and was completed in 2003.

In February 2018, Translink announced that Belfast Central would undergo a face-lift. This would see the entrance hall and East Bridge Street façade completely redesigned, with the removal of the Troubles-era blast wall. Inside, the ticket hall would be rebuilt and new retail and dining facilities provided. A Belfast Bikes dock will also be included in the redesigned station.

As part of the redesign, Belfast Central was renamed Lanyon Place on 1 September 2018. This is despite the fact that, strictly speaking, the station is not located there but on East Bridge Street.

It is expected that the Enterprise will move from Lanyon Place to the new transport hub  Great Victoria Street once that project is completed.

Service

Newry–Belfast–Bangor line

From Monday to Saturday, there is a half hourly service from Bangor to  Portadown, with some trains continuing on to Newry. During peak times there are up to 6 trains per hour operating to Bangor with 3 being express services and the other half being slow services stopping at all stations between here and Bangor. The service is reduced to hourly operation in the evenings. Some early morning trains in either direction will terminate at or start from Great Victoria Street rather than continuing on through Belfast to the respective outlying terminus.

On Sundays, the service is hourly operating between Bangor and Portadown. There are no local services calling at stations between Portadown and Newry on Sundays.

Larne line

At weekends, the service still runs half-hourly on Saturdays on the same alternating pattern to Whitehead or Larne Harbour. On Sundays, the service reduces to hourly operation, with the outbound terminus alternating every hour as before.

Derry~Londonderry line

All Derry~Londonderry Line trains call at Lanyon Place.

On Saturdays, the service is slightly reduced, however operation remains much the same as during the week. On Sundays, the hourly service alternately runs to Derry~Londonderry and Portrush.

Dublin line

There is an Enterprise train service every two hours between Dublin Connolly and Lanyon Place with the service being reduced to five trains each way on Sundays. The line is also used by rail passengers changing at Dublin Connolly onto the DART to Dún Laoghaire for example or travelling to Dublin Port for the Irish Ferries or Stena Line to Holyhead, and then by train along the North Wales Coast Line to London Euston and other destinations in England and Wales.

Rail and Sea Connections

Port of Belfast
The Port of Belfast has a Stena Line ferry connecting to Cairnryan for the bus link to Stranraer and onward trains along the Glasgow South Western Line to Glasgow Central.

Port of Larne
The Larne line connects with Larne Harbour with P&O Ferries sailing to Cairnryan for the bus link to Stranraer and onward trains along the Glasgow South Western Line to Glasgow Central, as well as alternative sailings by P&O Ferries to Troon also on the Glasgow South Western Line to Glasgow Central.

References

Railway stations in Belfast
Railway stations opened in 1976
Railway stations served by NI Railways
Railway stations served by Enterprise
Railway stations opened by NI Railways
1976 establishments in Northern Ireland
Railway stations in Northern Ireland opened in the 20th century